Warranwood is a suburb of Melbourne, Victoria, Australia, 25 km east of Melbourne's Central Business District, located within the City of Maroondah local government area.

Etymology

Warranwood is adjacent to Warrandyte South and Ringwood; its name is a conjunction of the two words. In 1946, the South Warrandyte Progress Association invited suggestions for a name, as at the time there was no definite name for the locality. At one time, it had been referred to as "Croydon Heights". The choice of "Warranwood" from part-time resident Mrs. J. Harrison of Brysons Road was accepted by postal authorities and the Shire of Lillydale.

Education

Two schools are located in Warranwood; Melbourne Rudolf Steiner School, on Wonga Road and Warranwood Primary School, on Wellington Park Drive.

Warranwood Primary was formerly known as Warrandyte South Primary and relocated from Hall Rd. in Warrandyte South to its current location in Term 2, 1996.

See also
 City of Doncaster and Templestowe – Warranwood was previously within this former local government area.

References

Suburbs of Melbourne
Suburbs of the City of Maroondah
City of Maroondah